Pig Destroyer is an American grindcore band formed in 1997 in Alexandria, Virginia.  The band was formed by vocalist J.R. Hayes, guitarist Scott Hull, and drummer John Evans. Throughout the band's earlier history, they were a three-piece group until sampler Blake Harrison joined in 2006, notably had no bassist until the inclusion of John Jarvis in 2013, and went through 2 past drummers with the role currently held by Adam Jarvis. Pig Destroyer is one of the most well-known grindcore bands in the genre due to Hayes's poetic lyrics, Hull's incorporation of thrash, punk, and doom influences in songwriting, and technical drum work.

Biography
The band formed in 1997 after the break-up of a short-lived political hardcore band, Treblinka, with 2 former members of said band, vocalist J. R. Hayes (Enemy Soil), guitarist Scott Hull (Agoraphobic Nosebleed, Japanese Torture Comedy Hour, ex-Anal Cunt), and drummer John Evans, who left the band for an unspecified school not long after the band's formation. After the departure of Evans, he was soon replaced by Brian Harvey.

In an interview, Scott Hull claims that they picked the band name on the criteria that it was insulting, yet somewhat more creative than the name of his last band, Anal Cunt. Deciding that "Cop Killer" or "Cop Destroyer" would be tactless, they eventually settled on "Pig Destroyer" ("pig" being a pejorative American slang term for the police). Derived from a non-musical source as extreme as the band's sound, Pig Destroyer's easily identifiable logo was created using a graphic from ANSWER Me! magazine as a template. 
Relapse Records signed the band and issued a split 7-inch with Isis on the label's Singles Series in July 2000. 38 Counts of Battery was a complete discography of Pig Destroyer releases up to the year 2000, which included split records with Gnob and influential screamo act Orchid, as well as their debut album, Explosions In Ward 6, and the demo that secured their record deal.

Prowler in the Yard, released in 2001, was the first of the band's records to really break through to what could contextually be considered the "mainstream". Garnering rave reviews from popular press such as Kerrang! and Terrorizer, the record earned Pig Destroyer headlining slots at the 2002 New England Metal and Hardcore Festival and the 2002 Relapse Records CMJ Showcase, as well as a high placing at 2003's Relapse Contamination Fest alongside scene legends High on Fire and The Dillinger Escape Plan (documented on the Relapse Contamination Fest DVD).

2004's Terrifyer boasted a much clearer sound than Prowler in the Yard or 38 Counts of Battery, as well as lyrics and prose from Hayes. The record came with an accompanying DVD soundscape entitled "Natasha", which was intended to be listened to in surround sound (although a more recent Japanese edition of the album has "Natasha" as an ordinary CD with four bonus tracks). Session guitarist Matthew Kevin Mills, Hull's former guitar teacher, recorded the lead guitar parts in the song "Towering Flesh".

A compilation of tracks from the split EPs with Gnob and Benümb is also available, entitled Painter of Dead Girls. The album features alternative versions of older songs from the 38 Counts era (such as "Dark Satellites"), a series of new songs (such as "Rejection Fetish" and "Forgotten Child"), and covers of bands who could be considered an influence (such as The Stooges and Helmet).

Pig Destroyer have stated that they would release a series of 9 split 7-inch EPs in 2006. Bands on the flipside include Orthrelm and Blood Duster; however, nothing has yet been released. The 7-inch series was put on hold for the release of Phantom Limb. Sampler Blake Harrison (Hatebeak, Triac) joined prior to recording of the album.

2007 saw the release of album Phantom Limb via Relapse Records, complete with album artwork designed by John Baizley (Baroness, Torche).

In 2011, Harvey was replaced by Misery Index drummer Adam Jarvis.

On August 8, 2012, the title and artwork for the band's fifth studio album, Book Burner, was announced. It was released on October 22, 2012. Pig Destroyer headlined the Terrorizer stage at the Damnation Festival in Leeds in November 2012, which marked their first United Kingdom show in eight years.

On March 4, 2013, Pig Destroyer released an EP titled Mass & Volume via Bandcamp. Recorded at the end of the Phantom Limb sessions, this EP was released as part of a charity effort to benefit the family of recently deceased Relapse Records employee Pat Egen. In September 2013, Adult Swim released the song "The Octagonal Stairway" as part of the 2013 Adult Swim Singles Series. In October 2013, Adam Jarvis's cousin John Jarvis joined Pig Destroyer as the band's first bass player. In 2014, “The Diplomat” (off of Book Burner) featured prominently in the season three finale of Comedy Central’s TV show Workaholics. In 2015, Relapse announced a deluxe reissue of the band's 2001 album Prowler In The Yard, which featured a remixed & remastered version of the album in various limited formats as well as previously unreleased music, photos, and other content.

On October 17, 2017, it was announced that Pig Destroyer had entered the studio to begin recording their 6th album. The album was slated for a Summer 2018 release. On May 14, 2018, the album's title was revealed, Head Cage, with the date being pushed back to September of the same year.

At least seven official promotional videos have been made of Pig Destroyer songs: "Piss Angel", from Prowler in the Yard; "Gravedancer", from Terrifyer; "Loathsome", from Phantom Limb; "The Diplomat", from Book Burner; "Army of Cops", "The Torture Fields", and "Mt. Skull" from Head Cage. The first three have aired on MTV2's Headbangers Ball, with each video seeing more airplay than the one that was released before it. The video for "Piss Angel" debuted on the show on Aug. 14, 2004, and was directed by Kenneth Thibault and Nathaniel Baruch. The video for "Gravedancer" was directed by Vladimir Lik and released in 2007. The video for "Loathsome" was directed by David Brodsky and debuted in late 2007. The video for "The Diplomat" was directed by Phil Mucci and released on October 26, 2012. The video for "Army of Cops" was released on YouTube on July 10, 2018. David Brodsky returned to direct the video. It was followed by the releases of "The Torture Fields" on August 8, directed by Frank Huang, and "Mt. Skull", which featured Better Call Saul actor Josh Fadem, on August 29, announced via Kerrang.

In early 2019 John Jarvis was dismissed from the band and replaced with Lody Kong guitarist Travis Stone. On August 28 of 2020, Pig Destroyer released their new EP, The Octagonal Stairway.

Influences
Scott Hull has mentioned artist Matthew Barney, author Dennis Cooper, and noise musicians Whitehouse as influencing his music. Pig Destroyer is inspired by thrash metal, such as Dark Angel and Slayer, the sludge metal of The Melvins, and American grindcore as practiced by Brutal Truth.

Members

Current
J. R. Hayes – vocals (1997–present)
Scott Hull – guitars (1997–present)
Blake Harrison – electronics (2006–present)
Adam Jarvis – drums (2011–present)
Travis Stone – bass (2019–present)

Former
John Evans – drums (1997–1998)
Brian Harvey – drums (1998–2011)
John Jarvis – bass (2015–2019)

Live musicians
Donna Parker – electronics (2006)
Jessica Rylan – keyboards (2006)

Timeline

Discography

Studio albums
Explosions in Ward 6 (1998)
Prowler in the Yard (2001)
Terrifyer (2004)
Phantom Limb (2007)
Book Burner (2012)
Head Cage (2018)

References

External links
Pig Destroyer at Relapse Records
Pig Destroyer on Myspace
Live Photos of Pig Destroyer at Blackened Music Series Event 2009

American grindcore musical groups
Deathgrind musical groups
Relapse Records artists
Heavy metal musical groups from Virginia
Musical groups established in 1997